USS C-5 (SS-16) was one of five C-class submarines built for the United States Navy in the first decade of the 20th century.

Description
The C-class submarines were enlarged versions of the preceding B class, the first American submarines with two propeller shafts. They displaced  on the surface and  submerged. The C-class boats had a crew of 1 officer and 14 enlisted men.

For surface running, they were powered by two  Craig gasoline engines, each driving one propeller shaft. When submerged each propeller was driven by a  electric motor. They could reach  on the surface and  underwater.

The boats were armed with two 18 inch (450 mm) torpedo tubes in the bow. They carried two reloads, for a total of four torpedoes.

Construction and career
C-5 was laid down by Fore River Shipbuilding Company in Quincy, Massachusetts, under a subcontract from Electric Boat Company, as Snapper, making her the first ship of the United States Navy named for the snapper. Snapper was launched on 16 June 1908 sponsored by Ms. A. Nicoll, and commissioned on 2 February 1910 with Lieutenant Chester W. Nimitz in command. She was renamed C-5 on 17 November 1911 and given hull number "SS-16" in 1920.

Service history
Snapper fitted out at the Boston Navy Yard, then began three years of training and tests along the East Coast and in Chesapeake Bay. She ran experiments with radio, submarine signalling apparatus, different types of batteries, and other equipment, all of which has since become standard in submarines. She joined in Fleet maneuvers helping to develop submarine tactics in submerged attacks on combatant ships, and engaged in operations with airplanes in the infancy of naval aviation. Highlights of the period were the reviews of the Fleet by President of the United States William H. Taft and Secretary of the Navy George von L. Meyer in November 1911 and October 1912.

On 20 May 1913, C-5 and her sisters of the First Group, Submarine Flotilla, Atlantic Fleet, commanded by Lieutenant (junior grade) R. S. Edwards in C-3, departed Norfolk, Virginia, in tow of submarine tender  and collier , for Guantánamo Bay, Cuba. From her arrival on 29 May, C-5 exercised in Cuban waters – principally conducting torpedo drills – until 7 December 1913. On that date, C-5 and her sisters of the redesignated First Division – escorted by four surface ships – sailed for Cristobal in the Panama Canal Zone. Five days later the ships completed the  passage, at that time the longest cruise made by United States submarines under their own power.

C-5 operated in Panamanian waters, conducting exercises and harbor defense patrols as well as studying the suitability of various ports of Panama for submarine bases. C-5 was decommissioned at Coco Solo in the Panama Canal Zone on 23 December 1919, and sold on 13 April 1920.

Fleet Admiral Chester Nimitz wrote of C-5:
Her Craig gasoline engines were built in Jersey City by James Craig, an extraordinarily wise and capable builder. Craig was a self-taught engineer who began as a draftsman in the Machinery Division of the New York Navy Yard and who started his "Machine and Engine Works" in Jersey City at a later date. C-5'''s engines were excellent as were also the Craig diesel engines he built for a subsequent submarine. These engines were designed and built by Craig and I have never forgotten his Foreword to the pamphlet of Operating Instructions which read briefly somewhat like this:

"No matter what the designer and the builder may have planned for these engines and no matter what the operator may try to do with them the Laws of Nature will prevail in the End''."
How True !!

Notes

References

External links

United States C-class submarines
World War I submarines of the United States
Ships built in Quincy, Massachusetts
1908 ships